The Battle of Złoczew, one of many clashes of the January Uprising, took place on 22 August 1863 near the town of Złoczew, which at that time belonged to Russian-controlled Congress Poland. A Polish insurgent unit under Edmund Taczanowski clashed with a detachment of the Imperial Russian Army and the battle resulted in Russian victory. The insurgents lost 5 men, and after the battle, Taczanowski ordered his party to withdraw towards Niechmirów.

References

Sources 
 Stefan Kieniewicz: Powstanie styczniowe. Warszawa: Państwowe Wydawnictwo Naukowe, 1983. .

Conflicts in 1863
1863 in Poland
Zloczew
August 1863 events